Changshu (Suzhounese: /d͡ʐan¹³ ʐoʔ²³/) is a county-level city under the jurisdiction of Suzhou, Jiangsu province, and is part of the Yangtze River Delta. It borders the prefecture-level city of Nantong to the northeast across the Yangtze River. Due to the mild climate and terrain there, it has enjoyed a high level of agricultural civilization since ancient times, and is named after this, for the first character of its name means "always, often", while the second means "ripe". The name of the adjacent county-level city of Taicang means "great granary".

History

Changshu first became an independent county in 540 AD, but in 581 was made subordinate to Suzhou. It was promoted to seat of a full prefecture in 1295, was rebuilt and fortified in the 14th century, but in 1370 was reduced again to the level of a county. In the 15th and 16th centuries Changshu was several times attacked by Japanese pirates.

Changshu has traditionally been a market town for locally produced rice, corn, wheat, tea, and mulberry leaves, and since the 13th century has been a major cotton-producing district. Although administratively still a subordinate city to Suzhou, it is a provincial base of foreign trade. Currently a harbour is being developed on the Yangtze River near Changshu to service Suzhou and Wuxi.

Economy
The city's major industries include textiles, paper-making, fine chemicals, machinery, steel and forestry products. The city has more than 4,000 textile and apparel companies with combined annual sales of RMB50 billion. The paper-making industry has attracted more the US$15 billion of FDI. By the end of 2007, this industry exceeded 2.4 million tons.

More than 2,000 foreign enterprises have invested in Changshu including big names such as Sharp and Dunlop. Of the contracted investment at least one-third has come from Taiwan – more than 500 Taiwan enterprises have invested more than US$100 million in the city. UPM-Kymmene from Finland has been running a paper mill in the city since 1999 and now has an annual capacity of 200,000 tons of coated and 600,000 tons of uncoated fine paper.

Administrative divisions
Changshu is divided into 2 subdistricts and 9 towns.

2 Subdistricts
 Bixi
 Dongnan

9 Towns

Discontinued/Merged towns

Climate

Infrastructure
The China National Highway 204 Yantai-Nantong-Changshu-Shanghai, Sujiahang Expressway and Suzhou-Jiaxing-Hangzhou all pass through Changshu. Changshu has one Yangtze River
crossing, the Sutong Yangtze River Bridge, one of the longest cable-stayed bridges in the world.

Education facilities

College and universities
Changshu Institute of Technology
UWC Changshu China 

High schools
Changshu High School of Jiangsu Province
High School of Changshu City
Changshu Foreign Language School
United World College of Changshu China

Tourism

Gardens and parks
Fangta Tower Park
Yushan Park
Shanghu Lake Park
The Zengs' Garden
The Zhaos' Garden
The Yan Garden

Hills
Yushan
Fushan Hills
Tongguan Hill
Dianshan Hill
Xishan Hill

Archaeological sites
Xingfu Temple
Zhongyong's Tomb
Yanzi's Tomb

Religion
Local people generally believe in Buddhism, Taoism, Protestantism and Catholicism. Changshu Christian Church is a Protestant church in the city.

Transportation
Railroad: the Yangtse Riverine Railway (planning)
Highways: the Yangtse Riverine Expressway, the Suzhou-Jiaxing-Hangzhou Expressway

Notable people
Huang Gongwang (1269–1354), one of the Four Masters of the Yüan dynasty
Shiwu (1272–1352), a Chan poet and hermit who lived during the Yuan Dynasty
Wang Hui (1632–1717), one of the "Four Wangs" representing the orthodox school of painting during the Ming and early Qing dynasties
Wu Li (1632–1718), one of the orthodox school of "literati painting" (wenrenhua) in the early Qing dynasty
Jiang Tingxi (1669–1732), official painter and grand secretary to the Imperial Court
Weng Tonghe (1830–1904), Confucian scholar and imperial tutor of two emperors during the Qing dynasty
Wang Ganchang (1907–1998), nuclear physics scientist
Zhang Guangdou (1911–2013), hydrologist

See also
List of twin towns and sister cities in China

References

External links

http://www.changshu.gov.cn/ - official Changshu City website
Changshu City English guide (Jiangsu Network)
Changshu City Guide & Culture Introduction - Mild China

 
Cities in Jiangsu
Administrative divisions of Suzhou
County-level divisions of Jiangsu